Hāena may refer to the following places in the U.S. state of Hawaii:
Hāena, Hawaii County, Hawaii, an unincorporated community
Hāena, Kauai County, Hawaii, an unincorporated community and census-designated place
Haena State Park